Flaveria floridana, the Florida yellowtops, is a North American plant species of Flaveria within the family Asteraceae. It has been found only along the Gulf Coast of Florida between Clearwater and Marco Island, mostly in the Tampa Bay region.

One plant can sometimes produce as many as 100 flower heads in a tightly packed array. Each head contains 9-14 yellow disc flowers. Sometimes it produces a single yellow ray flower as well.

References

External links 
photo of herbarium specimen at Missouri Botanical Garden, collected on Hog Island in 1901
Native Florida Wildflowers photos

floridana
Endemic flora of Florida
Plants described in 1903
Flora without expected TNC conservation status